Ypsonas FC is Cypriot football club based in Ypsonas of the Limassol District. Until May 14, 2019, the name of the club was Enosi Neon Ypsona-Digenis.

History 
The club was founded in 2014 after the merger of two clubs: Enosi Neon Ypsona and Digenis Akritas Ipsona.

In July 2022, Russian football blogger Yevgeny Savin has bought the club and became the new owner. He is intended to merge it with his other club FC Krasava.

Players

Current squad

References

External links
 
 

Football clubs in Cyprus
Association football clubs established in 2014
2014 establishments in Cyprus